"T.I.N.A." (pronounced "Tina", but also in stylization an acronym for This Is New Africa) is the fifth single by English-Ghanaian recording artist Fuse ODG, featuring guest vocals from Angel. The song features on his debut album of the same name. It was released in the United Kingdom as a digital download on 19 October 2014, after being pushed back from its originally scheduled release date of 5 October 2014.

Charts

Certifications

Release history

References

2014 singles
Fuse ODG songs
2014 songs